Sergey Aphanasievich Zimov (b. 18 July 1955) is a Russian geophysicist who specialises in arctic and subarctic ecology. He is the Director of Northeast Scientific Station (a research institute of the Russian Academy of Sciences), a senior research fellow of the Pacific Institute for Geography (an institute within the Far East Division of the Russian Academy of Sciences (FED RAS)), and one of the founders of Pleistocene Park (a 160 km2 wildlife preserve and a research substation of the Northeast Scientific Station).  He is best known for his work in advocating the theory that human overhunting of large herbivores during the Pleistocene caused Siberia's grassland-steppe ecosystem to disappear and for raising awareness as to the important roles permafrost and thermokarst lakes play in the global carbon cycle.

According to a colleague, Sergey Zimov is the most cited Russian earth scientist.

Life and work 

Sergei Zimov, born 18 July 1955, is a Russian scientist who resides in Cherskii, Sakha Republic, Russia.  He studied and received his degree in geophysics from Far East State University, located in Vladivostok, Russia.

Zimov founded the Northeast Science Station near Cherskii in 1977. Twelve years later, in 1988, he began the Pleistocene Park project.  In 1991, Sergei Zimov was awarded the Wolf Vishniac Award at the tenth International Symposium On Environmental Biogeochemistry (ISEB).

Professional highlights and accomplishments

Northeast Science Station 

Coordinates: 69 degrees 30 minutes North latitude, 161 degrees 30 minutes East longitude

Sergei Zimov is a co-founder and the director of the Northeast Science Station, one of the world's three largest Arctic stations.  Located near Cherskii, Russia on the mouth of the Kolyma River, 150 kilometers south of the Arctic Ocean, the station serves as a year-round base for international Arctic research.  Its focus lies on carbon cycles, methane fluxes, paleoclimate, and the changing ecosystem.  Founded in 1977, the Northeast Science Station boasts three laboratories, a network of field sites, tools for data analysis and communication, transportation, accommodation for visiting researchers, and a year round staff of six.  A barge floating on the Kolyma River serves as a traveling dormitory and laboratory.

Permafrost and methane 

In collaboration with Dr. Terry Chapin and Dr. Katey Walter-Anthony, Sergei Zimov has published a collection of scientific papers exposing the importance of permafrost and high-latitude carbon dioxide and methane emissions in the global carbon cycle.  These papers identified methane ebullition from thermokarst lakes to be a significant source of atmospheric methane, a potent greenhouse gas.

Permafrost is a large global carbon reservoir which has remained frozen throughout much of the Holocene.  Due to recent climate change, the permafrost is beginning to thaw, releasing stored carbon and forming thermokarst lakes.  When the thawed permafrost enters the thermokarst lakes, its carbon is converted into carbon dioxide and methane and released into the atmosphere.  Methane is a potent greenhouse gas and the methane emissions from thermokarst lakes have the potential to initiate a positive feedback cycle in which increased atmospheric methane concentrations lead to amplified global climate change, which in turn leads to more permafrost thaw and more methane and carbon dioxide emissions.

Pleistocene Park 

Zimov began the Pleistocene Park project in 1988 in northeastern Siberia near the Northeast Science Station in Cherskii, Sakha Republic, Russia. Pleistocene Park seeks to test the hypotheses that large herbivores maintained the Pleistocene tundra steppe and that overhunting by humans caused both the animals and Pleistocene ecosystem to vanish.

The grassland-steppe ecosystem, which dominated Siberia during the Pleistocene, disappeared 10,000 years ago and was replaced by mossy and forested tundra. Concurrently, many of the large herbivores that roamed Siberia during the Pleistocene, including mammoths, woolly rhinoceroses, bison, horses, musk oxen, elk, saiga, and yaks, vanished from the region. Today, reindeer and moose are the only surviving large herbivores to roam Siberia. Zimov and colleagues believe that humans, with their constantly improving technology, overhunted the large herbivores and led to their extinction and extirpation.  Without herbivores grazing and trampling over the land, mosses, shrubs, and trees were able to take over and replace the grassland ecosystem.

At Pleistocene Park, Zimov is attempting to re-create the Pleistocene grasslands to demonstrate that the grasslands would have persisted into the Holocene if humans did not overhunt the herds of Pleistocene herbivores that roamed and maintained the ecosystem. He has demonstrated that grasses take over the landscape 1–2 years after mosses are anthropogenically removed.  According to Zimov, reintroducing large herbivores to Siberia would initiate a positive feedback loop promoting the reestablishment of grassland ecosystems: "The animals, their hooves, they disturb the moss and let grasses grow instead. The soil dries out, the animals deposit their fertilizer, the grass grows more, and more animals can graze."

Current efforts in the park include reintroducing surviving Pleistocene megafauna into the fenced enclosure until they reach densities to change the vegetation and soil to a steppe grassland ecosystem. Zimov's goal for Pleistocene Park is to increase the number of large herbivores to 20 per square kilometer before then reintroducing predators, including wolves, bears, and Siberian tigers.

In 2007 a 35-meter high flux tower was erected in the park which constantly monitors the levels of methane, carbon dioxide, water vapor and energy (temperature) in the park's atmosphere.  The data among others contributes to the Global Monitoring Division of NOAA's Earth System Research Lab.

Zimov’s concept of Pleistocene Park and repopulating the mammoth steppe is listed as one of the “100 most substantive solutions to global warming” by Project Drawdown.  The list, encompassing only technologically viable, existing solutions, was compiled by a team of over 200 scholars, scientists, policymakers, business leaders and activists; for each solution the carbon impact through the year 2050, the total and net cost to society, and the total lifetime savings were measured and modelled.

Filmography
« L'hypothèse de Zimov » feature-length documentary (90 and 52 min) ; international co-production involving Arturo Mio, 13 Productions, ARTE France (France), Take Five, RTBF (Belgique) and Ethnofund (Russia). Film written and directed by Denis Sneguirev, in Russian and English; in post-production for a release scheduled for November 2021. (Film site; ARTE Germany)

Selected publications 

 
 This paper estimates that 33-87% of high-latitude increases in atmospheric methane originate from thermokarst lakes.  It is suggested that sediments which have been frozen since the Pleistocene, called yedoma, will have high methane-releasing potential as they thaw due to climate change.
 
 This paper quantifies methane emissions from thermokarst lakes in North Siberia.  Most of the methane is sourced to thawing permafrost from the lake margins.
  PDF
 This essay outlines the concept behind Pleistocene Park, Sergei Zimov's research site in which he seeks to demonstrate that human overhunting of Pleistocene megafauna led to the disappearance of the Pleistocene's grassland-steppe ecosystem.
 
 This paper suggests that increasing high-latitude ecological disturbances such as fires and grazing contribute to the long-term increase in atmospheric carbon dioxide.
 
 This paper contends that permafrost represents a significant global carbon sink.  As climate change causes permafrost to thaw, the stored carbon will be released and amplify global climate change.
 
 This paper identifies Pleistocene-aged soils, referred to as yedoma, as being a major carbon source for methane emissions from thermokarst lakes in North Siberia.

References

External links

Person 
 Dmitry Solovyov (2007): "Arctic science outpost a refuge from the world." Reuters, Science News, 24 September 2007. Accessed 2 November 2016.
 Eli Kintisch (2015): "Born to rewild. A father and son's quixotic quest to bring back a lost ecosystem – and save the world." In: Science, 4 December 2015, vol. 350, no. 6265, pp. 1148-1151. (Alternative version on the Pulitzer Center on Crisis Reporting website.) Accessed 2 November 2016.
 Roscongress (2016): "Sergey Zimov. Archaeoresuscitation." In Roscongress, Sochi 2016, Special Edition of the International Investment Forum "Sochi 2016", pp. 54–57 (pp. 56–59 of the PDF). Accessed 2 November 2016.

Projects 
 Official Pleistocene Park and Northeast Science Station Website
 Northeast Science Station Facility Website
 IASOA: Cherskii Observatory
 IASOA: Northeast Science Station
 IASOA: Pleistocene Park

Russian geophysicists
Russian ecologists
1955 births
Living people
People from the Sakha Republic